Jack Wolfe may refer to:

John Thomas Wolfe (1955–1995), Canadian politician
Jack A. Wolfe (1936–2005), American paleontologist
Jack Wolfe (artist) (1924–2007), American artist
Jack Wolfe (actor) (born 1995), English actor

See also
John Wolfe (disambiguation)